Clive Bradley (born 1959) is a British screenwriter who has written for film and television. After graduating from the National Film and Television School, he was one of the winners of the first Orange Prize for Screenwriting in 1999.

Career
Bradley's first work for television was the episode "Force of Nature" for ITV’s The Vice in 2001, a series for which he contributed two more episodes (2002-2003).

He has worked closely with Touchpaper Television, writing the three-part Last Rights (Channel Four Education 2004), A Harlot's Progress (Channel Four 2006), and the series City of Vice (Channel Four 2007), for which he was the lead writer; he and Peter Harness were nominated for a Writers' Guild of Great Britain award for the series.

That Summer Day (Children’s BBC 2006) won the BAFTA Award for Best Children’s Drama (2007).

WΔZ, directed by Tom Shankland, premiered in 2007.

He also wrote a two-part episode of the Irish police drama, Single-Handed. He teaches at the National Film and Television School.

In 2016 he won the Writers' Guild of Great Britain Award for "Best Long Form TV Drama" for co-writing the first series of the Icelandic TV series Trapped. (in Icelandic: Ófærð). He also wrote the second series, filmed in 2017.

In June 2021, Bradley was announced as the writer and showrunner of Netflix's Castlevania spinoff, set in 1792 France. In December, it was announced Bradley would be adapting Giles Milton's Winston Churchill's Ministry Of Ungentlemanly Warfare into a ten-episode television drama.

Politics
Bradley is a socialist and has been involved with the Alliance for Workers' Liberty and its predecessors since the 1980s.

References

External links
 
 Channel 4 City of Vice page
 Channel 4 Bradley interview re: Last Rights
 Review of City of Vice

1959 births
Living people
British male screenwriters
British television writers
Screenwriting instructors
British Trotskyists
Alliance for Workers' Liberty people
Alumni of the National Film and Television School
British male television writers